Scott Bellis is a Vancouver-based Canadian actor, director and theatre instructor. He has been working out of Vancouver since 1987. He was appointed as President of Canadian Actors' Equity Association in November 2017, having served as Councillor since 2012.

He is a founding member and Artistic Associate at Bard on the Beach Shakespeare Festival.

His television appearances have included Vancouver-based series such as The X-Files (as Max Fenig), The Dead Zone and MacGyver.

Training 
Bellis attended Studio 58 at Langara College in January 1985, graduating in 1987. He now teaches Scene Study and Acting Fundamentals at Studio 58, and is currently the lead instructor for the Arts Club's annual Actor's Intensive.

Bard on the Beach 
Scott Bellis first joined Bard on the Beach for their inaugural season in 1990, as an actor and supporter. He is considered one of the original founding members and has been involved in over 40 productions with the company. He became an Artistic Associate of Bard in 2004.

Productions 
Scott Bellis has been involved in over 130 productions across the country. Select companies include Bard on the Beach, Arts Club Theatre, Carousel Theater, Ruby Slippers, The Virtual Stage, Touchstone Theatre, Blackbird Theatre (Vancouver), Persephone Theatre (Saskatoon), Western Canada Theatre (Kamloops), Canadian Stage (Toronto), Vertigo (Calgary), and Manitoba Theatre Centre (Winnipeg).

Film credits 
Bellis has participated in many television series including The Outer Limits, Smallville, and The Dead Zone, television movies and feature films such as Little Women, Timecop, and Antitrust. His role in The X-Files was that of the alien abductee Max Fenig in the episodes of "Fallen Angel," "Tempus Fugit," and "Max."

Awards 
Scott Bellis has been nominated for 20 Jessie Richardson Theatre Awards. He has received awards for his performances in A Midsummer Night's Dream (Bard, 2007), All's Well that Ends Well (Bard, 2010), Avenue Q (Arts Club 2014), Aprés Moi (Ruby Slippers, 2016).

References

External links 

 

Living people
Year of birth missing (living people)
Canadian male television actors
Canadian male stage actors
Film directors from Vancouver
Male actors from Vancouver
Langara College people